Meryem Uslu (born 13 February 1987) is a German female kickboxer who has fought for the Glory kickboxing title against Tiffany van Soest. She is the former Wu Lin Feng World 55 kg champion.

Kickboxing career
In 2012 Uslu fought Lucy Payne for the KORE MMA Bantamweight Muay thai title. Payne defended the title by a unanimous decision. Later in the year, she fought Caley Reece for the WMC Women's World Featherweight Championship. Reece won the fight by unanimous decision. She also challenged Kim Dewulf for the IMC Muay Thai World title. Uslu won by unanimous decision.

In 2014 she fought Yang Yang for the Wu Lin Feng 55 kg title. Uslu won the title by a unanimous decision. In her next fight she fought Carol Earl for the WKF World 54.5 kg title. Uslu won the fight by unanimous decision. Uslu entered the Enfusion Season 5 Tournament, but lost to Marina Zueva in the first round.

Uslu made her first title defense of the Wu Lin Feng title against Xu Zhurong during Day of Destruction 10, and won a unanimous decision.

Uslu fought Anissa Meksen for the vacant WBC Muaythai World Bantamweight championship, but failed to win title.

In 2017 Uslu fought for two world titles. She first challenged Iman Barlow during Lion Fight 34 for the Lion Fight Super Bantamweight World title, but lost the fight by unanimous decision. Her second title challenge was for the Glory Women's Super Bantamweight Championship, but lost in the fourth round by TKO.

Championships and accomplishments

Professional
World Kickboxing Federation
WKF Kickboxing World Champion (-54.5 kg)
Wu Lin Feng
WLF Kickboxing World Champion (-55 kg)
International Muaythai Council
IMC Muay Thai World Champion

Amateur
World Kickboxing Association
2010 WKA German Kickboxing Champion
International Phetjan Thaiboxing Association
2006 IPTA German Amateur Muay Thai Champion
2007 IPTA European Muay Thai Champion (-56.7 kg)
Regional titles
2007 European Amateur Muay Thai Champion
2008 German National Muay Thai Champion

Kickboxing record

See also
 List of female kickboxers

References

External links
 Meryem Uslu at Awakening Fighters

1988 births
Bantamweight kickboxers
Female Muay Thai practitioners
German female kickboxers
Glory kickboxers
German Muay Thai practitioners
Living people
German people of Turkish descent
Sportspeople from Stuttgart